The 2012 Women's Hockey Champions Challenge I was the 7th edition of the field hockey championship for women. It was held from 29 September to 7 October 2012 in Dublin, Ireland. The tournament doubled as the qualifier to the 2014 Women's Hockey Champions Trophy to be held in Argentina as the winner earned an automatic berth to compete.

Australia won the tournament for the first time after defeating the United States 6 – 1 in the final, earning an automatic berth at the 2014 Women's Hockey Champions Trophy after their absence in the previous edition.

Qualification
The following eight teams announced by the FIH competed in this tournament.

 (Host nation)
 (Sixth in 2011 Champions Trophy)
 (Winners of 2011 Champions Challenge II)
 (Second in 2011 Champions Challenge I)
 (Third in 2011 Champions Challenge I)
 (Fifth in 2011 Champions Challenge I)
 (Seventh in 2011 Champions Challenge I)

Results
All times are Irish Standard Time (UTC+01:00)

First round

Pool A

Pool B

Second round

Quarterfinals

Fifth to eighth place classification

Crossover

Seventh and eighth place

Fifth and sixth place

First to fourth place classification

Semifinals

Third and fourth place

Final

Awards
The following awards were presented at the conclusion of the tournament:

Statistics

Final ranking

Goalscorers

References

External links
Official website

2012
Champions Challenge I
2012 in Irish women's sport
Champions Challenge I
International sports competitions hosted by University College Dublin
2010s in Dublin (city)
September 2012 sports events in Europe
October 2012 sports events in Europe